Maurice E. Schweitzer is Cecilia Yen Koo Professor, Professor of Operations and Information Management, at the Wharton School of Business at the University of Pennsylvania. Along with Adam Galinsky, he co-wrote Friend & Foe: When to Cooperate, When to Compete, and How to Succeed at Both.

Biography

Maurice Schweitzer is the son of Suzanne Schweitzer and Stuart Schweitzer (Professor at UCLA). He grew up in Los Angeles and lived in Oxford, England for a year in high school. Schweitzer graduated from University of California, Berkeley with honors in Economics. He received his Ph.D. in Operations and Information Management from University of Pennsylvania, Wharton School of Business,

Scientific impact
As of September 9, 2019, Schweitzer's work has been cited over 10,000 times.

Friend & Foe book
Maurice Schweitzer collaborated with Adam Galinsky to write their first book "Friend and Foe: When to Cooperate, When to Compete, and How to Succeed at Both". The book was published by Random House on September 29, 2015.

References

1967 births
Living people
American social psychologists
Wharton School of the University of Pennsylvania alumni
American male writers
Wharton School of the University of Pennsylvania faculty
University of California, Berkeley School of Information alumni